Bandung Raya (Indonesian, 'Greater Bandung') may refer to:

 Bandung metropolitan area, surrounding the city of Bandung, West Java, Indonesia
 Bandung Raya F.C., an Indonesian football team 1987–1997
 Pelita Bandung Raya, an Indonesian football team 2012–2015, later Madura United F.C.